This is a list of electoral results for the Electoral district of Blackwood in Western Australian state elections.

Members for Blackwood

Election results

Elections in the 1970s

Elections in the 1960s

Elections in the 1950s

References

Western Australian state electoral results by district